British migration to France has resulted in France being home to one of the largest British-born populations outside the United Kingdom. Migration from the UK to France has increased rapidly from the 1990s onwards. Estimates of the number of British citizens living in France vary from 170,000 to 400,000. Besides Paris, many British expatriates tend to be concentrated in the regions of southern France, Brittany, and recently the island of Corsica.

Demographics

Population size
There are conflicting estimates of the size of the British community in France. Estimates range from 172,000 to 400,000. The main destinations of British migration to France apart from Paris are rural areas of France and the southern areas of the country. The major regions chosen by this community are Nouvelle-Aquitaine, Occitanie, Brittany and Corsica. In Eymet, Dordogne, British immigrants account for a third of the local population, and in Saint-Nom-la-Bretèche and l'Etang-la-Ville in the Yvelines department near Paris, are a large proportion of UK nationals.

Today
In 2014, the National Statistics Institute (INSEE, for its acronym in French) published a study, reporting that there are double the number of British immigrants, this increase having resulted from the financial crisis that affected several countries in Europe in that period; as a result, this has driven up the number of Europeans living in France. The number of British immigrants in France increased by 50% between 2009 and 2012.

Other European immigrants in France: Portuguese 8%, British 5%, Spanish 5%, Italians 4%, Germans 4%, Romanians 3%, Belgians 3%. Displaced workers of Europe in France are: Poles (18% of the total), followed by the Portuguese people (15%) and Romanians (13%).

Notable people

See also 
French migration to the United Kingdom
France–United Kingdom relations
Swiss migration to France

References 

 
France
European diaspora in France